Dunn's road guarder (Crisantophis nevermanni) is a species of snake in the family Colubridae. The species is monotypic in the genus Crisantophis. It is endemic to Central America.

Geographic range
C. nevermanni is found in northwestern Costa Rica, El Salvador, Guatemala, western Honduras, and Nicaragua.

Reproduction
C. nevermanni is oviparous.

Etymology
The generic name, Crisantophis, is in honor of Miss Crisanta Cháves, who was director of the Museo Nacional de Nicaragua for over 50 years.

The specific name, nevermanni, is in honor of German coleopterist Wilhelm Heinrich Ferdinand Nevermann (1881–1938).

References

Further reading
Dunn ER (1937). "New or Unnamed Snakes from Costa Rica". Copeia 1937 (4): 213–215. (Conophis nevermanni, new species, p. 214).
Köhler G (2008). Reptiles of Central America, 2nd Edition. Offenbach, Germany: Herpeton Verlag. 400 pp. .
Savage JM (2002). The Amphibians and Reptiles of Costa Rica: A Herpetofauna between Two Continents, between Two Seas. Chicago and London: University of Chicago Press. xx + 945 pp. . (Crisantophis nevermanni, p. 586).
Villa, Jaime (1971). "Crisantophis, A New Genus For Conophis nevermanni Dunn". Journal of Herpetology 5 (3-4): 173–177. (Crisantophis nevermanni, new combination). (in English, with an abstract in Spanish).

Dipsadinae
Monotypic snake genera
Reptiles described in 1937